A list of animated feature films that were first released in 1975.

See also
 List of animated television series of 1975

References

Feature films
1975
1975-related lists